Miroslav Ouzký (born 18 August 1958 in Chlumec nad Cidlinou) is a retired Czech politician and former Member of the European Parliament for the Civic Democratic Party (European Conservatives and Reformists group).

Biography
He studied medicine at Charles University of Prague. He worked as a surgeon and director of a hospital in Kadaň. Thereafter, he served in a city council. In 1998 he was elected as a member of the Czech Parliament until 2004. Since then he has been a member of the European Parliament. On 20 July 2004 he was elected one of the 14 Vice-Presidents of the European Parliament. In February 2007, he became the Chair of the Environmental Committee of the European Parliament, succeeding Karl-Heinz Florenz.

He is married, and has a son and daughter.

External links

 Official website 
 Short biography 
 Civic Democratic Party (in English)

1958 births
Living people
People from Chlumec nad Cidlinou
Civic Democratic Party (Czech Republic) MEPs
MEPs for the Czech Republic 2004–2009
MEPs for the Czech Republic 2009–2014
Charles University alumni